Colin Pickthall (born 13 September 1944) is a politician in the United Kingdom. He was Labour Member of Parliament (MP) for West Lancashire. He was first elected to the House of Commons in 1992, and retired at the general election of 2005.

Pickthall's father was a shipyard fitter. He attended Ulverston Grammar School, and then the University of Wales, obtaining a B.A. Hons. in English Literature and History. He then went on to the University of Lancaster, where he obtained an M.A. with the thesis "The Influence of Socialism on 20th Century British Poetry". He became a member of the Campaign for Nuclear Disarmament, and the Labour Party, in 1963.

He married a Canadian, Judith Ann, in 1973; they have two daughters, Alisoun and Jenny. He initially worked as a lecturer of English at Ruffwood Comprehensive School and Edge Hill College of H.E. (where he became the Head of European Studies).

At the general election in June 1987, Pickthall ran for Parliament in West Lancashire, but lost to the Conservatives by 1,353 votes. Later, in 1989, he won the seat of Ormskirk on Lancashire County Council by a very small margin. However, this was sufficient for the Labour Party to take control of the County Council by one seat. 
 
At the April 1992 general election, he took the parliamentary seat of West Lancashire, and in the following elections, in May 1997 and June 2001, he retained the seat with a substantial majority. He became a member of the Select committee on Agriculture in 1992, the post that he maintained until 1997. He was appointed parliamentary private secretary (PPS) to Alun Michael MP in 1997, later serving Jack Straw MP. 

He resigned as PPS in December 2000 in response to the police investigation into his election expenses. He was reinstated shortly afterwards, in 2001, when the police investigation concluded there had been “no wrongdoing”. He was transferred to the Foreign Office in 2001, where he continued as Straw's PPS.

He pledged his "continuing support" for Tony Blair in July 2004, remarking that his performance has been "psychologically remarkable".

Pickthall is considered a leftist, frequently campaigning on animal welfare and environmental issues. He is opposed to hare coursing, as the Waterloo Cup took place at Great Altcar, in his constituency, and hunting. His support for the hunting ban led to pro-hunt supporters leaving a dead fox on his doorstep in February 2005. He retired from the House of Commons at the general election of May 2005.

Pickthall is a supporter of Humanists UK.

External links

References

1944 births
Living people
Members of Lancashire County Council
Labour Party (UK) councillors
Labour Party (UK) MPs for English constituencies
British humanists
Alumni of the University of Wales
Alumni of Lancaster University
Alumni of Lonsdale College, Lancaster
Academics of Edge Hill University
UK MPs 1992–1997
UK MPs 1997–2001
UK MPs 2001–2005
People from Dalton-in-Furness
People educated at Ulverston Grammar School